The 2023 Leagues Cup will be the third edition of the Leagues Cup, an inter-league  soccer tournament between Major League Soccer and Liga MX. It will be held from July 21 to August 19, 2023, with all 77 matches held in either the United States or Canada. The tournament is organized by MLS and the Mexican Football Federation and sanctioned by CONCACAF, the continental governing body for the sport in North America.

For the first time in the history of the competition, all MLS and Liga MX teams (47 total) will compete in the tournament, with both leagues taking a pause in their respective seasons to compete in the tournament. In addition, the Leagues Cup finalists and third-place team earn berths to the 2024 CONCACAF Champions League, with the winner automatically advancing to that tournament's Round of 16.

Format
The 2023 Leagues Cup will be the first edition where all MLS and Liga MX teams participate. The MLS Cup 2022 winner and the 2022 Clausura or 2022 Apertura champion with the highest aggregate points accumulated across 2022 will qualify automatically for the Round of 32. The remaining 45 teams will be placed into 15 groups of three.

For the group stage, teams will play one match against each team in their group. Regulation wins are worth three points and regulation losses are zero points. Matches tied after 90 minutes and advance to a penalty shootout where the winner earns two points and the loser earns one. All matches will be held in either the United States or Canada, with the MLS teams playing at home and intra-Liga MX matches played at MLS venues depending on their region.

The top two teams in each group advance to the Round of 32, joining the MLS Cup winners and highest-ranked Liga MX champion. This phase of the tournament will be a five-round single-leg knockout format with a third place match. The two finalists and third place team will earn berths for the 2024 CONCACAF Champions League, with the winner automatically advancing to the CCL Round of 16.

Teams and draw

The competition will feature all 47 clubs from the two leagues: 29 from MLS and 18 from Liga MX. Teams will be ranked by league using the 2022 Supporters' Shield standings for MLS and the 2022 aggregate table for Liga MX. The champions of each league will be given rank 1 and will receive a bye to the knockout stage. The top-15 remaining teams from each league will be placed into groups based on ranking and in reverse order (for example, the 2nd ranked MLS clubs is drawn against the 16th ranked Liga MX club). The remaining teams (13 MLS and 2 Liga MX) will be drawn into groups and divided into geographical regions.

Schedule
The schedule of the competition is as follows.

Group stage

The groups and their geographical pairings were announced on January 20, 2023.

West

Central

South

East

Knockout stage

In the knockout stage, teams play against each other over a single-leg format.

Bracket

Round of 32

Round of 16

Quarter-finals

Semi-finals

Third place play-off

Final

References

 
2023
2023–24 in CONCACAF football
2023 in American soccer
2023 in Canadian soccer

July 2023 sports events in North America
August 2023 sports events in North America
2024 CONCACAF Champions League
Scheduled association football competitions